Hydnocarpus kurzii is a species of plant in the family Achariaceae. It is found in India and Myanmar.

Working for Wellcome Chemical Research Laboratories, Pharmacist Frederick B. Power researched various species of chaulmoogra seeds from 1904. Power and colleagues created Chaulmoogric acid from seeds of what was then called the Taraktogenos kurzii tree, which had the formula C18H32O2.

References

kurzii
Data deficient plants
Taxonomy articles created by Polbot